Sofia Charlotta Olhede (born 1977) is a British-Swedish mathematical statistician known for her research on wavelets, graphons, and high-dimensional statistics and for her columns on algorithmic bias. She is a professor of statistical science at the EPFL (École Polytechnique Fédérale de Lausanne).

Education and career
Olhede earned a master's degree from Imperial College London in 2000, and completed her doctorate there in 2003. Her dissertation, Analysis via Time, Frequency and Scale of Nonstationary Signals, was supervised by Andrew T. Walden.

She began her academic career as a lecturer in statistics at Imperial in 2002, and moved to University College London as a professor in 2007. At University College London, she was also an honorary professor of computer science and an honorary senior research associate in mathematics. She became a professor at the Chair of Statistical Data Science at EPFL in 2019.

She was also a member of the Public Policy Commission of the Law Society of England and Wales, and served as university liaison director for University College London at the Alan Turing Institute for 2015–2016.

Research 
Her scientific work includes non-parametric function regression, high dimensional time series and point process analysis, and network data analysis.

Recognition
Olhede won an Engineering and Physical Sciences Research Council Leadership Fellowship in 2010, and an ERC consolidator fellowship in 2016. She was elected as a fellow of the Institute of Mathematical Statistics in 2018 "for seminal contributions to the theory and application of large and heterogeneous networks, random fields and point process, for advancing research in data science, and for service to the profession through editorial and committee work".

Selected works

References

External links
Home page
Personal website at EPFL
Website of the Chair of Statistical Data Science

Living people
1977 births
British statisticians
Women statisticians
Alumni of Imperial College London
Academics of Imperial College London
Academics of University College London
Fellows of the Institute of Mathematical Statistics
Mathematical statisticians